Antimony trisulfide is found in nature as the crystalline mineral stibnite and the amorphous red mineral (actually a mineraloid) metastibnite. It is manufactured for use in safety matches, military ammunition, explosives and fireworks. It also is used in the production of ruby-colored glass and in plastics as a flame retardant. Historically the stibnite form was used as a grey pigment in paintings produced in the 16th century. In 1817, the dye and fabric chemist, John Mercer discovered the non-stoichiometric compound Antimony Orange (approximate formula ), the first good orange pigment available for cotton fabric printing.

Antimony trisulfide was also used as the image sensitive photoconductor in vidicon camera tubes. It is a semiconductor with a direct band gap of 1.8–2.5 eV. With suitable doping, p and n type materials can be produced.

Preparation and reactions 
 can be prepared from the elements at temperature 500–900 °C:

 is precipitated when  is passed through an acidified solution of Sb(III).

 is readily oxidised, reacting vigorously with oxidising agents. It burns in air with a blue flame. It reacts with incandescence with cadmium, magnesium and zinc chlorates.

In the extraction of antimony from antimony ores the alkaline sulfide process is employed where  reacts to form thioantimonate(III) salts (also called thioantimonite):

These include:

Schlippe's salt, a thioantimonate(V) salt is formed when  is boiled with sulfur and sodium hydroxide. The reaction can be represented as:

Structure
The red form, metastibnite, is amorphous. Recent work suggests that there are a number of closely related temperature dependent structures of stibnite which have been termed stibnite (I) the high temperature form, identified previously, stibnite (II) and stibnite (III). Other paper shows that the actual coordination polyhedra of antimony are in fact , with (3+4) coordination at the M1 site and (5+2) at the M2 site. These coordinations consider the presence of secondary bonds. Some of the secondary bonds impart cohesion and are connected with packing.

References

Antimony(III) compounds
Sulfides